was a Japanese nationalist, priest, scholar of kokugaku, and Shinto fundamentalist. He was also a physician and military strategist. He is most often known by the pseudonyms  or, rarely, .

Biography
He studied under Nagase Masaki, and was noted for his scholarly studies of the Japanese classics of Higo as well as the writings of earlier scholars of the kokugaku movement. Among these, he was particularly influenced by the spiritual and cosmological writings of Hirata Atsutane.

A deeply religious man, Ōen placed substantial emphasis on the use of the ukehi ritual in divination, calling it, "the most wondrous of all Shinto rites".

In 1853, Ōen became aware of the arrival of the American naval squadron off the coast at Uraga. He immediately armed himself and, shouldering a votive image of Yahata, traveled to the scene, evidently with the intention of directly engaging the Americans. However, by the time he arrived, the diplomatic discussions had ended and the fleet had already departed.

After returning to Kumamoto, Ōen's teaching was changed. He became increasingly single-minded in the carrying out of rites and began instructing his students in methods to defend the country from the Americans, who he believed harbored a desire to eventually conquer or subjugate Japan. He assessed that the long peace of the Edo period had left Japan in a state of military inanition, and that it was likely that a total war against the European and American powers would end in Japan's destruction. However, he advocated the immediate prosecution of such a war on the grounds that it was necessary to defend Japan's native way of life at all costs, even if the nation's population should expire.

He advocated resistance to Western influence and trade, and recommended the expulsion of foreigners from Japan. His students included the swordsman-activist Todoroki Buhē and assassin Kawakami Gensai. In 1868, he became a teacher at the Jishūkan, and also worked as an advisor to Iwakura Tomomi within the new government. He died aged 73 at the home of his student Otaguro Tomoo. After his death, his students, led by Tomoo, adapted his teachings to form the basis of the Shinpūren movement.

A great deal of information about Ōen's life and activities was preserved by the Sakurayama Compatriots' Society (桜山同志会), established in 1886 for the bereaved family members of former Shinpūren warriors. Ishihara Shikō, an orphan left behind by the Shinpūren incident, wrote and lectured extensively on Ōen and his followers until his death in 1936.

References

1797 births
1870 deaths
Samurai
19th-century Japanese physicians
Japanese government officials
Japanese nationalists
Kokugaku scholars
Japanese theologians
Japanese military doctors
Meiji Restoration
People of the Boshin War
Japanese priests
Japanese Shintoists
Anti-Christian sentiment
Anti-Americanism
Military strategists